Easter Parade is a 1948 American Technicolor  musical film starring Judy Garland, Fred Astaire, Peter Lawford and Ann Miller. The music by Irving Berlin includes some of Astaire and Garland's best-known songs, including "Easter Parade", "Steppin' Out with My Baby", and "We're a Couple of Swells".

Gene Kelly was originally cast opposite Judy Garland, but he broke his ankle. The part was then offered to Fred Astaire, who had retired two years earlier.  Astaire, who was very eager to work again, consulted Kelly about the offer, and Kelly was happy to support his decision to take the role.  Garland and Astaire were a successful team, and Astaire was restored to his status as a top MGM star.

A critical and commercial success, Easter Parade was the highest-grossing musical film of 1948, and the second-highest grossing MGM musical of the 1940s, after Meet Me in St. Louis.

Plot
In 1912, Broadway star Don Hewes buys Easter presents for his sweetheart ("Happy Easter"), getting a boy to part with a plush rabbit by playing all the drums in the toy store ("Drum Crazy"). He takes the gifts to his dancing partner, Nadine Hale, who has been offered the opportunity to star in a show—solo. He tries to persuade her to stay with him ("It Only Happens When I Dance With You") but she has signed a contract. Don's best friend, Johnny, arrives. Nadine is clearly attracted to Johnny, but he resists her out of respect for Don.

Don drowns his sorrows at the bar at Pastini's restaurant, bragging to Johnny and Mike the  bartender that he can make a star dancer out of any girl from the floor show.  He chooses Hannah Brown. The next day, at rehearsal, he learns that she suffers from left/right confusion.

Don tries to turn Hannah into a copy of Nadine, teaching her to dance the same way, buying her a similar wardrobe, and giving her the exotic stage name "Juanita". She makes several mistakes at their first performance ("Beautiful Faces Need Beautiful Clothes"), and the show is a fiasco.

Johnny is instantly attracted to Hannah, singing "A Fella With an Umbrella" while walking her to rehearsal. He tries unsuccessfully to reunite Don with Nadine, who tells Don her friends are laughing, because Hannah is trying to be her. Don realizes his mistakes after Hannah sings—and they dance to—“I Love a Piano". He prepares routines better suited to her. Now known as "Hannah & Hewes", they become a great success  ("I Love a Piano," "Snookie-Ookums", "The Ragtime Violin", and "When That Midnight Choo-Choo Leaves For Alabam'”).

Auditioning for the Ziegfeld Follies, Hannah and Don meet the show's star—Nadine.  Realizing that Nadine is Don's former partner, Hannah demands to know if they were in love. At their hotel, Don reveals that he turned down the Ziegfeld offer, believing Hannah and Nadine do not belong in the same show:  Nadine can't compare with Hannah. They are about to kiss, when Johnny arrives to take Hannah to dinner. He confesses that he fell in love with her during the rainstorm, but Hannah admits that she is hopelessly in love with Don.

Don is in the audience when Nadine's show opens ("Shakin' The Blues Away"). Later, he reveals to Hannah that he has signed them to star in their own show and invites her out to do the town. She arrives at his apartment to find that he has arranged a private dinner. He makes the mistake of mentioning their act, and Hannah explodes, accusing him of treating their rendezvous like a dance rehearsal. She tries to leave, but he kisses her. She plays the piano and sings "It Only Happens When I Dance With You," “Why didn’t you tell me I was in love with you?” he asks, and they embrace.

Their show features Don and a large chorus ("Steppin' Out with My Baby")  followed by "We're a Couple of Swells", in which he and Hannah play bums. Afterward, they celebrate at the roof garden where Nadine is performing. The audience gives them a rousing ovation. Nadine is furious. After dancing to "The Girl on the Magazine Cover," she insists that Don perform one of their old numbers with her: "It Only Happens When I Dance With You (Reprise)". Don reluctantly agrees. Hannah leaves.

At Pastini's, where she and Don first met, Hannah pours out her troubles to Mike ("Better Luck Next Time"). She finds Don waiting outside her apartment. He tries to explain himself, promising to wait all night for her to forgive him, but the house detective evicts him just before she opens the door. The next morning, Johnny tells Hannah that if he loved someone, he would show them.

Hannah is inspired. Flowers, a chocolate egg and a live bunny in a top hat arrive anonymously at Don's apartment, followed by Hannah, who reminds him of their date and sings ("Easter Parade"). Don puts a diamond ring on her left hand as they walk in the Easter parade.

Cast
 Judy Garland as Hannah Brown.
 Fred Astaire as Don Hewes. Gene Kelly was originally cast as Don, but he broke his ankle just prior to production. Astaire, who had announced his retirement from film, was coaxed back by Kelly to replace him. Astaire would "retire" several more times over the next decade, but he would still go on to make a number of additional classic musicals in between retirements.
 Peter Lawford as Jonathan Harrow III. Frank Sinatra was at one point considered for this role
 Ann Miller as Nadine Hale. This film marked her major MGM debut. She had previously been under contract to RKO in the 1930s and then to Columbia Pictures in the early to mid-1940s, replacing Cyd Charisse, who withdrew from the production due to torn ligaments in her knee.
 Jules Munshin as François, the maître d'.
 Clinton Sundberg as Mike the bartender.
 Richard Beavers as the singer of "The Girl on the Magazine Cover"
 Jeni Le Gon as Essie, Nadine's maid (uncredited)
 Jimmy Bates as the boy in the toy shop (uncredited).
 Norman Barker as the trombonist who plays in the duet with Judy Garland (uncredited).
 Jimmie Dodd, who went on to lead The Mickey Mouse Club, as the cab driver after Hannah leaves the Ziegfeld audition (uncredited).

Awards and honors

The film is recognized by American Film Institute in these lists:
 2004: AFI's 100 Years...100 Songs:
 "Steppin' Out with My Baby" – Nominated
 2006: AFI's Greatest Movie Musicals – Nominated

Musical numbers
All songs by Irving Berlin
Performance credits below indicate both singing and dancing unless otherwise noted.
 "Happy Easter" (Fred Astaire)
 "Drum Crazy" (Astaire)
 "It Only Happens When I Dance With You" (Astaire singing, dancing with Ann Miller)
 "I Want To Go Back To Michigan" (Judy Garland)
 "Beautiful Faces Need Beautiful Clothes" (Astaire and Garland dancing)
 "A Fella with an Umbrella" (Peter Lawford, Garland)
 Vaudeville Montage: "I Love a Piano" (Garland singing, dancing with Astaire), "Snookey Ookums" (Astaire, Garland), "The Ragtime Violin" (Astaire singing, dancing with Garland), and "When the Midnight Choo-Choo Leaves for Alabam'" (Garland, Astaire)
 "Shakin' the Blues Away" (Miller)
 "It Only Happens When I Dance With You (reprise)" (Garland singing)
 "Steppin' Out with My Baby" (Astaire, chorus, and featured dancers Patricia Jackson, Bobbie Priest, Dee Turnell)
 "We're a Couple of Swells" (Astaire, Garland)
 "The Girl on the Magazine Cover" (Richard Beavers singing, Miller dancing)
 "It Only Happens When I Dance With You (instrumental)" (Astaire and Miller dancing)
 "Better Luck Next Time" (Garland singing)
 "Easter Parade" (Garland, Astaire)
 "Everybody's Doin' It Now" (Do Not Know) 

One musical number, a seductive performance of "Mr. Monotony" by Garland wearing a tuxedo jacket, black fedora, and black nylons (a style of dress which would become something of a trademark in later years after she wore the same outfit in Summer Stock), was cut from the film as it was deemed too risqué for a film supposedly set in 1912. Audiences finally got to see it in the 90s when an edited version was included in the 1994 compilation film That's Entertainment! III. It was first seen as part of the extras on the VHS and Laser Disc special edition versions the following year. When the film was released to DVD, several minutes of outtakes, raw footage, and alternative takes of this performance were included in addition to the footage previously released.

As with White Christmas six years later, it is impossible to remix the musical numbers from this film into Stereo or surround sound, because the original audio track recordings burned in a fire, leaving only a monaural composite track containing dialogue, music and effects, and an isolated music-only track intended for international release.

Reception
The film earned $4,144,000 in the US and Canada and $1,659,000 overseas.

Notes

External links

 
 
 
 
 
 Review of Easter Parade at TVGuide.com
  The Judy Room: Easter Parade section

1948 films
1948 musical films
American musical films
Films about entertainers
Films about musical theatre
Films directed by Charles Walters
Films produced by Arthur Freed
Films scored by Irving Berlin
Films scored by Johnny Green
Films set in 1912
Films set in 1913
Films set in New York City
Films that won the Best Original Score Academy Award
Films with screenplays by Sidney Sheldon
Jukebox musical films
Metro-Goldwyn-Mayer films
Films about Easter
1940s English-language films
1940s American films